Sherri Goodman (born 1959; New York, New York) has had a multidisciplinary career as a national security executive, public policy leader, board director and lawyer.   She is currently a Senior Fellow at the Polar Institute and the Environmental Change & Security Program at the Woodrow Wilson International Center, and Senior Strategist at the Center for Climate and Security.  She is the Secretary General of the International Military Council on Climate & Security.   Previously, she served as the President and CEO of the Consortium for Ocean Leadership.

General
Goodman served as Senior Vice President and General Counsel of CNA where she was also the founder and Executive Director of the CNA Military Advisory Board, whose landmark reports include National Security and the Threat of Climate Change (2007), and National Security and the Accelerating Risks of Climate Change (2014),  The Role of Water Stress in Instability and Conflict (2017), and Advanced Energy and US National Security (2017) among others. She appeared as herself in the 2010 film Carbon Nation, and Jared P. Scott's 2016 film The Age of Consequences in which Goodman is featured, is based on the work of the CNA Military Advisory Board.

Goodman served as the first Deputy Undersecretary of Defense (Environmental Security) from 1993 to 2001. As the chief environmental, safety, and occupational health officer for the Department of Defense (DoD), she oversaw an annual budget of over $5 billion.  She established the first environmental, safety and health performance metrics for the Department and, as the nation's largest energy user, led its energy, environmental and natural resource conservation programs. Overseeing the President's plan for revitalizing base closure communities, she ensured that 80% of base closure property became available for transfer and reuse.  She developed and led the Arctic Military Environmental Cooperation Program which removed hazardous liquid waste streams from decommissioned Russian nuclear submarines in the 1990s. 

In early October 1997, Goodman opposed the Kyoto Protocol, arguing it would harm "military readiness", influencing U.S. climate change negotiators to advocate for military exemptions to the climate change treaty. In June 1998, after the exemptions were agreed to by a Conference of the Parties decision in December 1997, Goodman praised the treaty for preserving the "ability to conduct military operations." She continued to defend the exemptions in opinion pieces in later years.

Beginning in 1987, Goodman served on the staff of the Senate Armed Services Committee for Committee Chairman Senator Sam Nunn. She has practiced law at Goodwin Procter, as both a litigator and environmental attorney, and has worked at RAND and SAIC.

Goodman serves on the boards of the Atlantic Council, the Joint Ocean Commission Leadership Council, the Marshall Legacy Institute, the National Executive Committee of the US Water Partnership, the Advisory Committee of the US Global Change Research Program, Sandia National Laboratory's Energy and Homeland Security External Advisory Board,  and the University Corporation for Atmospheric Research (UCAR). She is a life member of the Council on Foreign Relations, served on its Arctic Task Force in 2016 and on the Board of its Center for Preventative Action.

Previously, she served on the Boards of Blue Star Families, the Committee on Conscience of the United States Holocaust Memorial Museum, the National Academy of Sciences’ Boards on Energy and Environmental Systems (BEES) and Environmental Systems and Toxicology (BEST), the Secretary of State's International Security Advisory Board, and the Woods Hole Oceanographic Institution.

She has also served on the Responsibility to Protect Working Group co-chaired by former Secretary of State Madeleine Albright.

In 2010, Goodman served on the Quadrennial Defense Review Independent Panel co-chaired by former National Security Advisor, Stephen Hadley, and former Secretary of Defense, William Perry.

Goodman has testified before numerous committees of the U.S. Congress, and conducted interviews with print, television, radio and online media. She has been an Adjunct Lecturer in International Affairs and Security at the Harvard Kennedy School and an Adjunct Research Fellow at the Kennedy School's Belfer Center for Science and International AffairsCenter for Science and International Affairs.  She has been an Advisor to Virginia Tech and the University of Chicago for curriculum on environmental security.

A summa cum laude graduate in 1981 of Amherst College, Goodman has a J.D. degree in 1987 from Harvard Law School and a master's degree in public policy in 1987 from the Harvard's J.F.K. School of Government.

Honors
Goodman received an Honorary Doctorate in Humane Letters from Amherst College in 2018, and has twice received the DoD Medal for Distinguished Public Service, the Gold Medal from the National Defense Industrial Association, and the EPA’s Climate Change Award.

Personal
Born in New York City, Sherri Lynn Wasserman is the daughter of George (February 20, 1931 – February 19, 2015; b. Cologne, Germany) and Renate Wasserman, Holocaust refugees who arrived in New York in the 1930s. Her father, a Korean War Army veteran, received an MBA from Columbia University and worked for thirty years as an organizational consultant for IBM, and her mother worked for an art consulting service, Windmueller Fine Arts, in Scarsdale, New York.  Sherri and John Goodman have three children: Natalie, Robert and Matthew.

See also
Climate change mitigation
Climate change adaptation
Effects of global warming

References

External links
Sherri W. Goodman
One of Sherri W. Goodman's works
Sherri W. Goodman on The National Interest

Living people
United States Department of Defense officials
Harvard Kennedy School alumni
1959 births
Harvard Law School alumni
Climate activists
American women chief executives
Amherst College alumni
21st-century American women